is a Japanese footballer currently playing as a midfielder for Tegevajaro Miyazaki.

Career statistics

Club
.

Notes

References

1998 births
Living people
Fukuoka University alumni
Japanese footballers
Association football midfielders
Japan Football League players
J3 League players
Tegevajaro Miyazaki players